Amidar is a state-owned housing company in Israel.

The company was founded in 1949. Its mission statement is "to be involved in construction projects, development, population and maintenance in Israel". It is a major provider of subsidized and rent-controlled housing, primarily for the lower socio-economic sector of the population.

Its major stock holders are the Jewish Agency for Israel (50%), the Jewish National Fund (20%) and the Israeli government (20%).

References

External links
Official website 

Real estate companies established in 1949
Government-owned companies of Israel
Real estate companies of Israel
1949 establishments in Israel